Robert Damon Lyles (born March 21, 1961) is a former professional American football player who played the position of linebacker for eight seasons in the National Football League for the Houston Oilers and for the Atlanta Falcons. Lyles later served as a head coach in Arena Football League, coaching the Los Angeles Avengers in 2001 and the Georgia Force in 2002.

Lyles suffered multiple strokes in 2022. As of September 2022, he is in critical condition in a Texas hospital and needs a heart transplant.  With his NFL health insurance expired, his medical expenses were approximately $100,000 as of September 2022, and friends had raised about half that amount.

References

1961 births
Living people
American football linebackers
Houston Oilers players
Atlanta Falcons players
TCU Horned Frogs football players
Los Angeles Avengers coaches
Georgia Force coaches
Hamilton Tiger-Cats coaches
Houston Roughnecks coaches
Players of American football from Los Angeles
Belmont High School (Los Angeles) alumni
Coaches of American football from California
Sports coaches from Los Angeles